Bhanu Bhakta Joshi is a Nepalese politician, belonging to the CPN-UML. In the 2008 Constituent Assembly election he was elected from the Bajhang-1 constituency, winning 13955 votes and in 1994 Nepalese general election he was elected from Bajhang 1 (constituency) , winning 12,603 votes. He also served as Minister for Forests and Soil Conservation in Jhalanath Khanal cabinet.

Electoral History
2008 Constituent Assembly election 
 
Bajhang-1

1994 legislative elections

Bajhang-1

References

Living people
Communist Party of Nepal (Unified Marxist–Leninist) politicians
1969 births
People from Bajhang District
Nepal MPs 1994–1999

Members of the 1st Nepalese Constituent Assembly
Nepal MPs 2022–present